Moncton is a city in New Brunswick, Canada.

Moncton may also refer to:

 Moncton Parish, New Brunswick, Canada, a civil parish
 the local service district of the parish of Moncton, a former LSD comprising the unincorporated parts of the civil parish
 , a Kingston-class coastal defence vessel
 , a Flower-class corvette

See also
 Moncton's Mosaic-tailed Rat, a rodent found only in Papua New Guinea
 Monckton (disambiguation)
 Monkton (disambiguation)